Miloš, also called Little Miloš, is an unmanned ground vehicle (UGV) developed by the Military Technical Institute, following the development of unmanned ground vehicle Milica in 2009. UGV Miloš is in serial production and first customer are Serbian Armed Forces.

Overview

During 2009 Military Technical Institute presented its first battle UGV, Milica. Continuous development lead to a new UGV, named Miloš. Miloš has better autonomy and a smaller remote control station which is carried and operated by a single soldier. The UGV fits into small trailer and can be carried by smaller 4x4 military vehicles or in numbers on larger vehicles to the deployment zone. For surveillance and detection it uses thermal camera, a day and night camera, and a laser ranger. It has one or two weapons attached on its turret. Maximum total weight is around 700 kg or 300 kg of cargo. Two day/night cameras are installed on front and back for driving. It can recognize solder using charge coupled device up to 1000 meters, and has thermal camera that enables recognition up to 450 meters. Included as part of equipment is laser rangefinder for range up to 2000 meters.

It was presented to the public at the 2017 Partner military fair in Belgrade.

Versions

There are several versions of Little Miloš:
Armed
Transport
Medical evacuation

Operators

 - 12+ in service in the 72nd Brigade for Special Operations of the Serbian Armed Forces, more on order

Potential operators

After the 2018 UMEX fair, the UAE requested to test UGV Miloš for their armed forces.

See also
 Foster-Miller TALON

References

Military Technical Institute Belgrade
Unmanned ground combat vehicles
Military vehicles introduced in the 2020s